Lincolnshire rebellion may refer to:

The 1470 Lincolnshire Rebellion, fomented by Warwick the Kingmaker against Edward IV of England, put down by John de la Pole, 2nd Duke of Suffolk
The Lincolnshire Rising of October 1536, a two-day rising by the county's Catholics against the Dissolution of the Monasteries